Baýramdurdi Meredow (27 March 1979) is a Turkmen former footballer who played as a defender. He was part of the Turkmenistan squad for the 2004 AFC Asian Cup.

References 

Living people
Turkmenistan footballers
Turkmenistan expatriate footballers
Turkmenistan international footballers
Association football defenders
1979 births
Footballers at the 2002 Asian Games
Asian Games competitors for Turkmenistan
Expatriate footballers in Kazakhstan
Turkmenistan expatriate sportspeople in Kazakhstan